London Square (Kikar London) is a public plaza in the center of Tel Aviv, Israel

The square was named in honor of the citizens of London, England who withstood the bombing of the United Kingdom by Nazi Germany during World War II—The Blitz.

References

Squares in Tel Aviv